The following is a list of Atriplex species accepted by the Plants of the World Online as at June 2022:

Atriplex abata 
Atriplex acanthocarpa 
Atriplex acutibractea 
Atriplex acutiloba 
Atriplex aellenii 
Atriplex alaschanica 
Atriplex alces 
Atriplex altaica 
Atriplex amboensis 
Atriplex ambrosioides 
Atriplex ameghinoi 
Atriplex amnicola 
Atriplex angulata 
Atriplex arazdajanica 
Atriplex argentea 
Atriplex argentina 
Atriplex asplundii 
Atriplex atacamensis 
Atriplex aucheri 
Atriplex australasica 
Atriplex barclayana 
Atriplex belangeri 
Atriplex billardierei 
Atriplex boecheri 
Atriplex braunii 
Atriplex brenanii 
Atriplex buchananii 
Atriplex bunburyana 
Atriplex cana 
Atriplex canescens 
Atriplex centralasiatica 
Atriplex cephalantha 
Atriplex chapinii 
Atriplex chenopodioides 
Atriplex chilensis 
Atriplex chizae 
Atriplex cinerea 
Atriplex clivicola 
Atriplex codonocarpa 
Atriplex colerei 
Atriplex confertifolia 
Atriplex congolensis 
Atriplex coquimbana 
Atriplex cordifolia 
Atriplex cordubensis 
Atriplex cordulata 
Atriplex coriacea 
Atriplex cornigera 
Atriplex coronata 
Atriplex corrugata 
Atriplex costellata 
Atriplex coulteri 
Atriplex crassifolia 
Atriplex crassipes 
Atriplex crenatifolia 
Atriplex crispa 
Atriplex cristata 
Atriplex cryptocarpa 
Atriplex cyclostegia 
Atriplex davisii 
Atriplex dimorphostegia 
Atriplex dioica 
Atriplex drymarioides 
Atriplex eardleyae 
Atriplex eichleri 
Atriplex elachophylla 
Atriplex elegans 
Atriplex eremitis 
Atriplex erigavoensis 
Atriplex erosa 
Atriplex espostoi 
Atriplex exilifolia 
Atriplex eximia 
Atriplex farinosa 
Atriplex fera 
Atriplex fissivalvis 
Atriplex flabelliformis 
Atriplex flabellum 
Atriplex flavida 
Atriplex fominii 
Atriplex frankenioides 
Atriplex frigida 
Atriplex fruticulosa 
Atriplex gardneri 
Atriplex garrettii 
Atriplex glabriuscula 
Atriplex glauca 
Atriplex glaucescens 
Atriplex gmelinii 
Atriplex graciliflora 
Atriplex griffithii 
Atriplex halimus 
Atriplex hollowayi 
Atriplex holocarpa 
Atriplex hortensis 
Atriplex humifusa 
Atriplex humilis 
Atriplex hymenelytra 
Atriplex hymenotheca 
Atriplex hypoleuca 
Atriplex hystrix 
Atriplex iljinii 
Atriplex imbricata 
Atriplex incrassata 
Atriplex infrequens 
Atriplex intermedia 
Atriplex intracontinentalis 
Atriplex isatidea 
Atriplex johnstonii 
Atriplex jubata 
Atriplex julacea 
Atriplex klebergorum 
Atriplex kochiana 
Atriplex laciniata 
Atriplex laevis 
Atriplex lampa 
Atriplex lanfrancoi 
Atriplex lapponica 
Atriplex lasiantha 
Atriplex lentiformis 
Atriplex leptocarpa 
Atriplex leuca 
Atriplex leucophylla 
Atriplex limbata 
Atriplex lindleyi 
Atriplex linearis 
Atriplex linifolia 
Atriplex lithophila 
Atriplex littoralis 
Atriplex lobativalvis 
Atriplex longipes 
Atriplex macropterocarpa 
Atriplex madariagae 
Atriplex malvana 
Atriplex matamorensis 
Atriplex maximowicziana 
Atriplex mendozaensis 
Atriplex micrantha 
Atriplex mollis 
Atriplex moneta 
Atriplex monilifera 
Atriplex montevidensis 
Atriplex morrisii 
Atriplex muelleri 
Atriplex muricata 
Atriplex myriophylla 
Atriplex nana 
Atriplex nessorhina 
Atriplex nilotica 
Atriplex nitrophiloides 
Atriplex nogalensis 
Atriplex nudicaulis 
Atriplex nummularia 
Atriplex obconica 
Atriplex oblongifolia 
Atriplex obovata 
Atriplex oestophora 
Atriplex oreophila 
Atriplex ornata 
Atriplex pacifica 
Atriplex paludosa 
Atriplex pamirica 
Atriplex pamparum 
Atriplex papillata 
Atriplex paradoxa 
Atriplex parishii 
Atriplex parryi 
Atriplex patagonica 
Atriplex patens 
Atriplex patula 
Atriplex pedunculata 
Atriplex perrieri 
Atriplex peruviana 
Atriplex philippica 
Atriplex philippii 
Atriplex phyllostegia 
Atriplex plebeia 
Atriplex polycarpa 
Atriplex portulacoides 
Atriplex powellii 
Atriplex pratovii 
Atriplex procumbens 
Atriplex prosopidum 
Atriplex prostrata 
Atriplex pseudocampanulata 
Atriplex pueblensis 
Atriplex pumilio 
Atriplex pungens 
Atriplex pusilla 
Atriplex quadrivalvata 
Atriplex quinii 
Atriplex quixadensis 
Atriplex recurva 
Atriplex repanda 
Atriplex repens 
Atriplex reptans 
Atriplex retusa 
Atriplex rhagodioides 
Atriplex robusta 
Atriplex rosea 
Atriplex rusbyi 
Atriplex saccaria 
Atriplex sagittata 
Atriplex sagittifolia 
Atriplex schugnanica 
Atriplex semibaccata 
Atriplex semilunaris 
Atriplex serenana 
Atriplex sibirica 
Atriplex sorianoi 
Atriplex spegazzinii 
Atriplex sphaeromorpha 
Atriplex spinibractea 
Atriplex spinifera 
Atriplex spinulosa 
Atriplex spongiosa 
Atriplex stipitata 
Atriplex stocksii 
Atriplex straminea 
Atriplex sturtii 
Atriplex subcordata 
Atriplex suberecta 
Atriplex sukhorukovii 
Atriplex taltalensis 
Atriplex tampicensis 
Atriplex tatarica 
Atriplex tianschanica 
Atriplex tichomirovii 
Atriplex tornabenei 
Atriplex torreyi 
Atriplex truncata 
Atriplex tularensis 
Atriplex turbinata 
Atriplex turcica 
Atriplex turcomanica 
Atriplex undulata 
Atriplex valdesii 
Atriplex vallenarensis 
Atriplex velutinella 
Atriplex verrucifera 
Atriplex vesicaria 
Atriplex vestita 
Atriplex vulgatissima 
Atriplex watsonii 
Atriplex wolfii 
Atriplex yeelirrie 
Atriplex zahlensis 
Atriplex × aptera 
Atriplex × gustafssoniana 
Atriplex × neomexicana 
Atriplex × northusanum 
Atriplex × odontoptera 
Atriplex × taschereaui

References

Atriplex